The Statute Law Revision Act 1872 (No. 2) (35 & 36 Vict c 97) is an Act of the Parliament of the United Kingdom.

It was intended, in particular, to facilitate the preparation of the revised edition of the statutes then in progress.

The enactments which were repealed (whether for the whole or any part of the United Kingdom) by this Act were repealed so far as they extended to the Isle of Man on 25 July 1991.

The Schedule to this Act was repealed by the Statute Law Revision Act 1894 (57 & 58 Vict c 56).

This Act was repealed for the United Kingdom by Group 1 of Part IX of Schedule 1 to the Statute Law (Repeals) Act 1998.

This Act was retained for the Republic of Ireland by section 2(2)(a) of, and Part 4 of Schedule 1 to, the Statute Law Revision Act 2007.

See also
Statute Law Revision Act

References
Halsbury's Statutes,
The Public General Statutes passed in the Thirty-Fifth and Thirty-Sixth Years of the Reign of Her Majesty Queen Victoria, 1872. Queen's Printer. East Harding Street, London. 1872. Pages 731 et seq. Digitised copy from Internet Archive.

External links
List of amendments and repeals in the Republic of Ireland from the Irish Statute Book.
  ["Note" and "Schedule" of the bill (unlike the schedule of the act as passed) gives commentary on each scheduled act, noting any earlier repeals and the reason for the new repeal]

United Kingdom Acts of Parliament 1872